Greg Sebald (born 11 April 1963) is a Greek bobsledder. He competed at the 1994 Winter Olympics and the 1998 Winter Olympics.

References

1963 births
Living people
Greek male bobsledders
Olympic bobsledders of Greece
Bobsledders at the 1994 Winter Olympics
Bobsledders at the 1998 Winter Olympics
Place of birth missing (living people)